John Brocklehurst, DL, MP (30 October 1788 – 13 August 1870), known as John Brocklehurst the younger, was an English silk manufacturer, banker and Liberal Party politician from Macclesfield in Cheshire.  He sat in the House of Commons for 36 years, from 1832 to 1868.

Brocklehurst was the second of three sons of John Brocklehurst, of Macclesfield and Lea Hall in Cheshire, and became a partner in one of the most successful banking and silk-manufacturing companies in Macclesfield.

Under the Reform Act 1832, the town gained the right to elect two Members of Parliament (MPs), and Brocklehurst was elected at the 1832 general election as one of the first two MPs for the newly enfranchised borough of Macclesfield. He held the seat through nine further elections until he retired from Parliament at the 1868 general election, when his eldest son William Coare Brocklehurst was elected in his place.  He attended the House of Commons regularly, and although rarely spoke in the chamber, he was held in great respect by advanced Liberals. He was both a magistrate and a Deputy Lieutenant of the County Palatine of Cheshire.

Family 
Brocklehurst married Mary Coare, with whom he had four daughters and four sons in 1814. These included:
 William Coare Brocklehurst (1818–1900), who succeeded his father as one of Macclesfield's MPs
 Henry Brocklehurst (1819–1870), the father of John Brocklehurst, 1st Baron Ranksborough (1852-1921) and Henry Dent-Brocklehurst (1856-1932) whose grandson was Mark Dent-Brocklehurst
 Emma Dent (1823–1900) who married the heir to Sudeley Castle in Gloucestershire, and spent much of her life restoring the property, laying out the gardens, and collecting antiquities and artefacts
 Philip Lancaster Brocklehurst (1827–1904) who inherited the Swythamley sporting estate in Staffordshire from his uncle William, and was created a baronet in 1903
 Marianne Brocklehurst (1832–1898) was a noted traveller and collector of Egyptian antiquities who, along with her brother Philip donated her collection to the West Park museum in Macclesfield.

References

External links 

1788 births
1870 deaths
People from Macclesfield
English bankers
Liberal Party (UK) MPs for English constituencies
UK MPs 1832–1835
UK MPs 1835–1837
UK MPs 1837–1841
UK MPs 1841–1847
UK MPs 1847–1852
UK MPs 1852–1857
UK MPs 1857–1859
UK MPs 1859–1865
UK MPs 1865–1868
Deputy Lieutenants of Cheshire
John
19th-century British businesspeople